Ernest Wagstaff (8 April 1928 – November 2003) was an Australian sailor. He competed in the 5.5 Metre event at the 1960 Summer Olympics.

References

External links
 

1928 births
2001 deaths
Australian male sailors (sport)
Olympic sailors of Australia
Sailors at the 1960 Summer Olympics – 5.5 Metre
Sportspeople from Melbourne